Otok  is a village in the administrative district of Gmina Gryfice, within Gryfice County, West Pomeranian Voivodeship, in north-western Poland.

Before 1637 the area was part of the Duchy of Pomerania. In 1815–1945 it was part of the Province of Pomerania. For the history of the region, see History of Pomerania.

The village has a population of 275.

Notable residents
 Peter Ernst Wilde (1732–1785), physician

References

Otok